The Civic Initiative of Gora is a Gorani political party in Kosovo.

History
The party held a seat in the Community Assembly of Kosovo and Metohija, which was not recognized by the Republic of Kosovo.

The Civic Initiative of Gora has stated that they want Gora (a former municipality with a Gorani majority that was merged with Opolje to form the Dragaš municipality which has an Albanian majority) to join the Community of Serb Municipalities. On 3 November 2013 70% voted in favour of establishing the Gora municipality as part of the Community of Serb Municipalities, according to Gorani political leader Safet Kuši.

Electoral results

Parliamentary elections

References

Gorani people
Political parties of minorities in Kosovo